La Vicentina is an electoral parish or district of Quito, Ecuador. The parish was established as a result of the October 2004 political elections when the city was divided into nineteen urban electoral parishes.

References

Parishes of Quito Canton
2004 establishments in Ecuador